The 1961 Icelandic Cup was the second edition of the National Football Cup.

It took place between 14 August 1961 and 22 October 1961, with the final played at Melavöllur in Reykjavik between KR Reykjavik and IA Akranes. Teams from the Úrvalsdeild karla (1st division) did not enter until the quarter finals. In prior rounds, teams from the 2. Deild (2nd division), as well as reserve teams, played in one-legged matches. In case of a draw, the match was replayed.

First round

Second round 
 Entrance of Breiðablik UBK, Vikingur Reykjavik, ÍB Isafjörður, Keflavík ÍF and reserve teams from Fram Reykjavik B and Valur Reykjavik B

Third round

Quarter finals 
 Entrance of 6 clubs from 1. Deild

Semi finals

Final

See also 

 1961 Úrvalsdeild
 Icelandic Cup

External links 
 1961 Icelandic Cup results at the site of the Icelandic Football Federation 

Icelandic Men's Football Cup
Iceland
1961 in Iceland